End Citizens United (ECU) is a political action committee in the United States. The organization is working to reverse the U.S. Supreme Court 2010 decision in Citizens United v. Federal Election Commission, which deregulated limits on independent expenditure group spending for or against specific candidates. It is focused on driving larger campaign donations out of politics with a goal to elect "campaign-finance reform champions" to Congress by contributing and raising money for these candidates as well as running independent expenditures. End Citizens United was founded in 2015, operating in its first election cycle during 2016 with more than $25 million in funding.

The organization has endorsed Democratic candidates such as Zephyr Teachout, Hillary Clinton, Russ Feingold, Beto O'Rourke, Elizabeth Warren, and Jon Ossoff. For the 2016 election, it was one of the largest outside groups funding the campaigns of U.S. Senators Maggie Hassan and Catherine Cortez Masto, spending a combined $4.4 million on the races. By mid-2017, End Citizens United had raised more than $7.5 million from grassroots donations, and planned to raise $35 million for the 2018 election cycle. In 2020, End Citizens United spent 41% ($16.1 million) of its income on media, 17% ($6.5 million) on staff salaries, and 15% ($5.7 million) on contributions to candidates and strategy and research work.  

In early 2018, an anonymous U.S.-based contractor paid at least 3,800 micro job workers to manipulate what stories would come up when people searched for the PAC via Google.

During the 2018 elections, End Citizens United organized a no corporate PAC pledge, and around 185 Democratic candidates agreed not to take corporate PAC money, including Alexandria Ocasio-Cortez, Cory Booker, and Kamala Harris.

References

External links
Official website
How to Reverse Citizens United
OpenSecrets.org Summary

United States political action committees
Campaign finance reform in the United States